Moonchild is a novel written by the British occultist Aleister Crowley in 1917. Its plot involves a magical war between a group of white magicians, led by Simon Iff, and a group of black magicians, over an unborn child. It was first published by Mandrake Press in 1929 and its recent edition is published by Weiser.

In this work, numerous acquaintances of Crowley appear as thinly disguised fictional characters. Crowley portrays MacGregor Mathers as the primary villain, including him as a character named SRMD, using the abbreviation of Mathers' magical name. Arthur Edward Waite appears as a villain named Arthwaite, and the unseen head of the Inner Circle of which SRMD was a member. "A.B." is theosophist Annie Besant. Among Crowley's friends and allies Allen Bennett appears as Mahatera Phang, Leila Waddell as Sister Cybele, the dancer Isadora Duncan appears as Lavinia King, and her companion Mary D'Este (mother of Preston Sturges, and who helped Crowley write his magnum opus Magick: Book 4 under her magical name 'Soror Virakam') appears as Lisa la Giuffria. Cyril Grey is Crowley himself, while Simon Iff is either an idealized version of an older and wiser Crowley or his friend Allen Bennett.

Plot summary
A year or so before the beginning of World War I, a young woman named Lisa la Giuffria is seduced by a white magician, Cyril Grey, and persuaded into helping him in a magical battle with a black magician and his black lodge. Grey is attempting to save and improve the human race and condition by impregnating the girl with the soul of an ethereal being — the moonchild. To achieve this, she will have to be kept in a secluded environment, and many preparatory magical rituals will be carried out. The black magician Douglas is bent on destroying Grey's plan. However, Grey's ultimate motives may not be what they appear. The moonchild rituals are carried out in southern Italy, but the occult organizations are based in Paris and England. At the end of the book, the war breaks out, and the white magicians support the Allies, while the black magicians support the Central Powers.

Critical reception
On October 25, 1929, the Aberdeen Press commented on Moonchild:

Related writings
Crowley also wrote a number of short stories where the character Simon Iff investigates various crimes and mysteries.

See also

Works of Aleister Crowley

Notes

1917 British novels
1923 British novels
1917 fantasy novels
1923 fantasy novels
Thelemite texts
Works by Aleister Crowley